The 1979 FIBA World Championship for Women (Korean: 1979 FIBA 세계 여자 선수권 대회) was hosted by South Korea from 29 April to 13 May 1979; the United States won the tournament.

Venues

Competing nations

Squads

Preliminary round

Group A

|}
(H) – host nation.

Group B

|}

Group C

|}

Classification round 

|}

Final round 
The United States qualified outright for the final round of the tournament by the virtue of silver medal finish at the 1976 Olympic Games.

|}

Final standings

Awards

References
Results (Archived 2009-05-06)

FIBA Women's Basketball World Cup
FIBA
FIBA
FIBA
Sport in Seoul
April 1979 sports events in Asia
May 1979 sports events in Asia
1970s in Seoul